A solar charger  is a charger that employs solar energy to supply electricity to devices or batteries. They are generally portable.

Solar chargers can charge lead acid or Ni-Cd battery banks up to 48 V and hundreds of ampere hours (up to 4000 Ah) capacity. Such type of solar charger setups generally use an intelligent charge controller. A series of solar cells are installed in a stationary location (ie: rooftops of homes, base-station locations on the ground etc.) and can be connected to a battery bank to store energy for off-peak usage. They can also be used in addition to mains-supply chargers for energy saving during the daytime.

Most portable chargers can obtain energy from the sun only. Examples of solar chargers in popular use include:
Small portable models designed to charge a range of different mobile phones, cell phones, iPods or other portable audio equipment.
Fold out models designed to sit on the dashboard of an automobile and plug into the cigar/12v lighter socket to keep the battery topped up while the vehicle is not in use.
Flashlights/torches, often combined with a secondary means of charging, such as a kinetic (hand crank generator) charging system.
Public solar chargers permanently installed in public places, such as parks, squares and streets, which anyone can use for free.

Voltage regulator
A solar panel can produce a range of charging voltages depending upon sunlight intensity, so a voltage regulator must be included in the charging circuit so as to not over-charge (overvoltage) a device such as a 12 volt car battery.

Solar chargers on the market 
Portable solar chargers are used to charge cell phones and other small electronic devices on the go. Chargers on the market today use various types of solar panels, ranging from thin film panels with efficiencies from 7-15% (amorphous silicon around 7%, CIGS closer to 15%), to the slightly more efficient monocrystalline panels which offer efficiencies up to 18%.

The other type of portable solar chargers are those with wheels which enable them to be transported from one place to another and be used by a lot of people. They are semi-public, considering the fact that are used publicly but not permanently installed.

The solar charger industry has been plagued by companies mass-producing low efficiency solar chargers that don't meet the consumer's expectations. This in turn has made it hard for new solar charger companies to gain the trust of consumers. Solar companies are starting to offer high-efficiency solar chargers.
Portable solar power is being utilized in developing countries to power lighting as opposed to utilizing kerosene lamps which are responsible for respiratory infections, lung and throat cancers, serious eye infections, cataracts as well as low birth weights. Solar power provides an opportunity for rural areas to "leapfrog" traditional grid infrastructure and move directly to distributed energy solutions.

Some solar chargers also have an on-board battery which is charged by the solar panel when not charging anything else. This allows the user to be able to use the solar energy stored in the battery to charge their electronic devices at night or when indoors.

Solar chargers can also be rollable or flexible and are manufactured using thin film PV technology. Rollable solar chargers may include Li-ion batteries.

Currently, foldable solar panels are coming down in price to the point that almost anyone can deploy one while at the beach, biking, hiking, or at any outdoor location and charge their cellphone, tablet, computer etc. Some companies such as GoSun have incorporated a solar charger into a table so that can have more than one function.

Gallery

See also 

Solar cell phone charger

References 

Battery chargers
Energy harvesting
Solar-powered devices
Photovoltaics